Blue Night is an album by drummer Art Blakey and The Jazz Messengers recorded in 1985 in the Netherlands and released on the Dutch Timeless label.

Reception

Scott Yanow of Allmusic stated "This excellent Timeless CD has a version of "Body and Soul" along with seven stimulating (if not overly memorable) recent originals by bandmembers. Fine modern hard bop".

Track listing 
 "Two of a Kind" (Terence Blanchard) - 9:52   
 "Blue Minor" (Jean Toussaint) - 11:27   
 "Blue Night" (Lonnie Plaxico) - 7:25   
 "Body and Soul" (Frank Eyton, Johnny Green, Edward Heyman, Robert Sour) - 7:26   
 "Mr. Combinated" (Donald Harrison) - 6:39   
 "Two of a Kind" [alternate take] (Blanchard) - 9:22 Bonus track on CD reissue   
 "Blue Minor" [alternate take] (Toussaint) - 8:51 Bonus track on CD reissue     
 "Mr. Combinated" [alternate take] (Harrison) - 6:50 Bonus track on CD reissue

Personnel 
Art Blakey - drums
Terence Blanchard - trumpet
Donald Harrison - alto saxophone
Jean Toussaint - tenor saxophone
Mulgrew Miller - piano
Lonnie Plaxico - bass

References 

Art Blakey albums
1985 albums
Timeless Records albums